Laetitia Yhap (born 1941) is a British artist.

Yhap was born in St Albans, Hertfordshire, and studied at the Camberwell School of Art and the Slade School of Art.

Her work is in the permanent collections of Hastings Museum and Art Gallery, the Tate Gallery, the British Council and the New Hall Art Collection at the University of Cambridge.

References

1941 births
Living people
20th-century English women artists
21st-century English women artists
Alumni of Camberwell College of Arts
Alumni of the Slade School of Fine Art